Boriduiyeh (also Romanized as Borīdū’īyeh, Barīdū’īyeh, and Beridoo’eyeh; also known as Barīdū and Borīdū’ Yeh) is a village in Dashtab Rural District, in the Central District of Baft County, Kerman Province, Iran. At the 2006 census, its population was 250, in 48 families.

References 

Populated places in Baft County